The 2015–16 Liga Leumit was the 17th season as second tier since its re-alignment in 1999 and the 74th season of second-tier football in Israel.

A total of sixteen teams were contesting in the league, including eleven sides from the 2014–15 season, the three promoted teams from 2014–15 Liga Alef and the two relegated teams from 2014–15 Israeli Premier League.

Changes from 2014–15 season

Team changes

Bnei Yehuda Tel Aviv and Hapoel Kfar Saba, were promoted to the 2015–16 Israeli Premier League.

Hapoel Petah Tikva and FC Ashdod were directly relegated to the 2015–16 Liga Leumit after finishing the 2014–15 Israeli Premier League season in the bottom two places.

Hakoah Ramat Gan, and  Ironi Tiberias were directly relegated to Liga Alef after finishing in the previous season in last two league places. They were replaced by Hapoel Katamon Jerusalem and Hapoel Ashkelon who finished first their respective 2014–15 Liga Alef.

Overview

Stadia and locations

The club is playing their home games at a neutral venue because their own ground does not meet Premier League requirements.While Kiryat Gat Municipal Stadium is under construction. Maccabi Kiryat Gat will host their home games in Sala Stadium.While Yavne Municipal Stadium is under construction. Maccabi Yavne will host their home games in Ness Ziona Stadium.

Regular season

Playoffs

Top playoff

Bottom playoff

Relegation playoff

Relegation playoff
The 14th-placed Hapoel Jerusalem faced 2015–16 Liga Alef promotion play-offs winner, F.C. Kafr Qasim. The matches took place on May 27 and 31, 2016.

Hapoel Jerusalem won 3–1 on aggregate and remained in Liga Leumit. F.C. Kafr Qasim remained in Liga Alef.

Season statistics

Scoring

Source: Israel Football Association

Discipline
Most yellow cards: 13
Salem Abu Siam (Hapoel Bnei Lod)
Daniel Solomon (Maccabi Kiryat Gat)
Most red cards: 3
Israel Rosh (Hapoel Ramat Gan)
Uri Peso (Hapoel Petah Tikva)
Ryan Adeleye (Hapoel Jerusalem)

See also
 2015–16 Israel State Cup

References

2
Liga Leumit seasons
Isr